Nim Ka Thana railway station is a railway station in Sikar district, Rajasthan. Its code is NMK. It serves Nim Ka Thana town. The station consists of two platforms. Passenger, Express, and Superfast trains halt here.

Trains

The following trains halt at Nim Ka Thana railway station in both directions:

 Chetak Express
 Bandra Terminus–Delhi Sarai Rohilla Express
 Chandigarh–Bandra Terminus Superfast Express
 Ajmer–Delhi Sarai Rohilla Jan Shatabdi Express

References

Railway stations in Sikar district
Jaipur railway division